Leszek Swornowski (born 28 March 1955) is a Polish fencer. He won a silver medal in the team épée event at the 1980 Summer Olympics.

References

1955 births
Living people
Polish male fencers
Olympic fencers of Poland
Fencers at the 1976 Summer Olympics
Fencers at the 1980 Summer Olympics
Olympic silver medalists for Poland
Olympic medalists in fencing
Sportspeople from Wrocław
Medalists at the 1980 Summer Olympics
20th-century Polish people
21st-century Polish people